The Train march led by Sirajul Haq Amir of the Jamaat-e-Islami Pakistan, started on 25 June 2022 from Rahim Yar Khan. Earlier, while addressing a press conference in Lahore, Jamaat-e-Islami Deputy Amir Liaquat Baloch said that Amir Siraj-ul-Haq would address 50 major and minor venues during the march.

The train will left Multan for Lahore on 26 June at 1 pm. On 27 Jun, in the third and final phase of the train march, Ameer Jamaat-e-Islami Siraj-ul-Haq will left for Rawalpindi by Rail Car Express.

References

2022 in Pakistani politics
June 2022 events in Pakistan
Jamaat-e-Islami Pakistan